Nakamatsu (written: 中松) is a Japanese surname. Notable people with the surname include:

Jon Nakamatsu (born 1968), American classical pianist
, Japanese inventor

Japanese-language surnames